Scopula compensata, the small frosted wave, is a moth of the family Geometridae. It was described by Francis Walker in 1861. It is found in southeastern North America, including Alabama, Florida, Georgia and South Carolina.

References

Moths described in 1861
Moths of North America
compensata
Taxa named by Francis Walker (entomologist)